These are the international rankings of Mauritius

Economy

Environment and ecology

Politics

Education

Media

Communication and Information Technology

Others

.

See also 
 List of international rankings

References

Mauritius